A pelt is the fur and skin of an animal. 

Pelt or Pelts may also refer to:

Arts and entertainment
Pelt (band), American drone music band
Pelt (album), 2005 
"Pelts" (Masters of Horror), an episode of the TV series
The Pelt, poetry book/CD by Doseone

People
Adriaan Pelt (1892–1981), a Dutch journalist and international diplomat
Jean-Marie Pelt (1933–2015), French botanist
Roman Pelts (born 1937), Ukrainian-Canadian chess master

Other uses
Pelt (municipality), Belgium 
Gotland Pelt, a breed of domestic sheep

See also

Pelte (disambiguation)
Van Pelt, a surname